Ubiquitin-like protein 3 is a protein that in humans is encoded by the UBL3 gene.

In melanocytic cells UBL3 gene expression may be regulated by MITF.

References

Further reading